Baudrecourt (from 1915 to 1918, before Baudrecourt) is a commune in the Moselle department in Grand Est in northeastern France.

Situated between Nancy and Metz, it is the terminus of the first phase of the LGV Est train line connecting Paris to Strasbourg.

Population

See also
 Communes of the Moselle department

References

External links
 

Communes of Moselle (department)